Tanjiashan Town is an urban town in Xiangtan County, Hunan Province, People's Republic of China.

Administrative division
The town is divided into 28 villages and five communities.

 Zuotang Community
 Zuzhu Community
 Qingshanling Community 
 Shanpo Community 
 Tudimiao Community
 Gaoshan Village 
 Chayuan Village 
 Quanfeng Village
 Jinquan Village 
 Xiaochong Village 
 Xianglong Village 
 Maoting Village
 Bangtang Village
 Changtang Village 
 Pingtang Village 
 Tielu Village 
 Zhuxia Village
 Changling Village 
 Tangxia Village 
 Nanquan Village
 Gaotang Village
 Shihong Village
 Yuetang Village
 Xian'e Village
 Huamen Village
 Xinlong Village
 Gangtie Village
 Tongpai Village
 Chaolian Village
 Xinquan Village
 Chenjialong Village
 Heyeba Village

Economy
The region abounds with coal and limestone.

Rice and pig are important to the economy.

Culture
Huaguxi is the most influence local theater.

Transportation
The major highways are the 107 National Road and the 313 Provincial Road.

References

External links

Divisions of Xiangtan County